Senator Standridge may refer to:

Greg Standridge (1957–2017), Arkansas State Senate
Rob Standridge (fl. 1980s–2010s), Oklahoma State Senate